Għaxaq is a village in the Southern Region of Malta, with a population of 4,722 people as of March 2014. It is mainly a residential area surrounded by land used for agricultural purposes. The village's name is probably related to the noble family named Axiaq (also spelt Axiak or Asciak) which had feudal lands in the area in the fourteenth century, or it may be derived from the Maltese word meaning delight.

The village's main church is dedicated to the Assumption of Mary, popularly known in Maltese as Santa Marija, which is therefore the village's patron saint. Celebrations take place annually from 30 July to 15 August. A secondary feast is celebrated on the week before the first Sunday of June. This is dedicated to Saint Joseph, husband of Mary. He is also the saint patron of the church.   During these feasts the village is decorated with highly artistic statues and colourful lights and banners.

Saint Mary's Parish Church
 

Għaxaq's main church is dedicated to the Assumption of Our Lady and it is known for its baroque architecture. The present church was consecrated on 2 May 1784, after around fifty years of hard work by the villagers, which gave a helping hand in building their religious shrine. One could find a large number of artistic and valuable items in this church which were made by renowned Maltese and foreign artists. Of these one could find a number of highly artistic statues which all seek great devotion in a way or another. The titular statue which depicts the Assumption in heaven of our Lady was carved in wood by Mariano Gerada in 1808. Another statue which could be found in this church is that of the Main Secondary Feast of Saint Joseph, which was made by Fratelli Bertarelli of Milan in Italy in 1932 and is also carved in wood. Other statues are those of Our Lady of the Rosary carved in wood by Alessandro Farrugia, Our Lady of Fátima, and a set of traditional eight statues depicting the passion of Jesus Christ. These were made throughout the years with statues of Maltese artists Peppi Vella, Carlo Darmanin and family Camilleri Cauchi, namely Alfred and Aaron Camilleri Cauchi. The statue of dead Christ known as Il-Monument was brought to Għaxaq from Rome in the 18th century. The paintings which decorate the church's ceiling were painted by Emvin Cremona during the 1960s while other works of art date back to the 16th, 17th and 18th centuries mostly painted by Maltese artists; Gio Nicola Buhagiar, Francesco Zahra, Rokku Buhagiar and Gianni Vella among others. Apart from the Titular feast of Saint Mary, which is celebrated annually on August 15th, other feasts are celebrated throughout the year. These are; the commemoration of the Passion of Jesus Christ and his rise from death- with the traditional Good Friday procession, which in Għaxaq is held on Palm Sunday evening, celebrated a Sunday before Easter, the Main Secondary feast of Saint Joseph celebrated on the first Sunday of June, Corpus Christi on the second Sunday of June, and Our Lady of the Rosary on the second Sunday of October. These are all organized by their respective confraternities. On the night between the 24th and 25th of December, a solemn mass is held to celebrate Christmas.

Band Clubs

Għaxaq is known for its two feasts which are celebrated on the 15th of August and the first Sunday of June. The Holy family seeks a great devotion in this village, in fact it is the only village in Malta which has its Titular and Main Secondary feast dedicated to Saint Mary and Saint Joseph respectively, which together with Jesus, they form the Holy Family. Throughout the years, two Social and Musical Societies emerged in the village and they contribute for the external celebrations of their respective patron saint.

Saint Mary Band Club Ħal Għaxaq A.D 1873
In 1808, this club was set up from simply a wine shop to the majestic band club present today.
 
The feast of St Mary has been and still is a popular feast among the Maltese people, especially where the village church has as its Titular St. Mary. Traditionally St Mary is linked to the Santa Maria Convoy which brought much needed food supplies to the Maltese. This took place exactly on August 15th,1942, during the peak of the Second World War. Having its church dedicated to the Assumption of Mary since 1511, the village of Għaxaq in the south east of Malta is no exception.

Since 1808, the village has been documented to have celebrated this feast, both the religious part and the secular part, with vigor and pomp.  The religious aspect was reflected in the fact that an artistic statue was made by a well known sculptor Mariano Gerada. This was financed by Gio Maria Farrugia (1763–1828) and cost 800 scudi. An artistic plinth was also made. The Farrugia family tree is endorsed at St. Mary's Band Club. In those days they had their wine shop. They talked mostly about the feast, year in year out. One shop was called Ta’ Indri l-Mikk. People used to meet there and given the aspirations of the locals, this stop was the forerunner of the present band club. Indri took it upon himself to organize the outside (secular) feast of St. Mary.  The square in front of the church was decorated with colourful bundings. The church's façade was illuminated with hundreds of oil lamps. This was the work of the Gatt, Duca, Desira and Scicluna's families.
 
In 1873 the people named above explored the possibility of moving from this shop to much bigger premises. Agreement was reached on buying a big house in the square known as Ta’ Bukkettuwa. After initial work was completed, the club came to be known as Circolo La Stella. 
 
It was at Ta' Petistina that the first general sitting was held, and it was agreed that the first official committee members were to be drawn following a ballot. The first steering committee was elected, and was made up of Felic Gatt, Joseph Grima, Joseph Scicluna and Geraldu Scicluna.  More members were added, like Agius, Abdilla and Gravina. Later on, in 1935, a band was also formed under the name Santa Maria Band.
 
Many years passed since then and today the band club has a great number of members and followers. Today, the Band Club is also renowned for the organization of the Ghaxaq Music Festival, a 2 to 5 day festival organized before the feast of Saint Mary in August. Since 2008, the Festival has featured renowned World Artists and Tribute Bands such as: Tracy Shields in a Tribute to Celine Dion (2008), Rhapsody UK in a Tribute to the legendary Queen (2009 and 2011), U2UK (2009), ABBA UK (2010), Gimme ABBA (2011), Sheyla Bonnick from the original BoneyM (2011) and the legendary group SMOKIE (2012). This festival started in 1998 as a Street Concert and since then it has also featured a lot of Maltese groups and singers such as: Tribali, Wintermoods, Scream Daisy, Freddie Portelli, Joe Brown Band and renowned Maltese "Għannejja" among other well known local artists and DJs such as; Carl Bee, DJ Ruby and DJ Armani.

The Club also possesses a lot of artistic street decorations, having a large number of statues and their pedestals dating back to more than 100 years ago. These together with new sets of drapes, chandeliers and other statues decorate the village during the first two weeks of August.

Fireworks also play an important part during the Maltese traditional feast. The Saint Mary Fireworks Factory consists of a number of voluntary professionals in the art of firework production. These people have also achieved 1st place in a number of local and International Fireworks Festivals both for the aerial as well as the ground fireworks. The Saint Mary Fireworks Team was also invited to take part as International guests in The 2011 FireworksOne Festival at Foggia,San Severo, Italy. Moreover, after the huge success they achieved in 2011, the Ghaxaq Local Council also presented them with the "Ġieħ Ħal Għaxaq", a prestigious award given annually to people who work and achieve success for the village.

Thus, although a small village, the people of Ghaxaq have at heart the feast of St. Mary, and this is reflected in their dedication shown during 3 whole weeks of religious and secular activities for St. Mary's feast.

Saint Joseph Band Club

The Saint Joseph Band Club was established in 1874 with the principal object of organizing and enhancing the feast of St. Joseph in collaboration with the Confraternity of Saint Joseph, an older Catholic Church organization dating back to around 1689. Since then, the Band Club has taken under its remit the external festivities while the Confraternity has concentrated on the liturgical celebrations. The Club used to also participate in the feast of the Assumption of St. Mary until the early 1950s, when this participation was discontinued.

Presently, the feast of Saint Joseph is celebrated annually on the first Sunday of June, though in past years the date was earlier in May.

The Band Club's biggest ever project is surely its premises. During a project spanning from the early 1980s until the official opening in May 2000, the Club acquired both previously rented and adjacent property, demolished the existing structures and rebuilt a unitary building.  The building is considered as a prime example of Maltese baroque-style architecture, and in certain aspects takes Maltese craftsmanship to new heights.  A visitor to the building should not fail to note the symmetrical curved staircase topped by a dome structure, the various relief sculpture adorning various walls, ceilings, cornices and pedestals, and the first floor halls.

On the first floor, there is also a niche with the older statue of Saint Joseph, which was replaced in 1933 with the present devotional statue retained in the Church for the devotion of the Catholic community.  The older statue has been restored this year 2010 and it transpired that the wooden statue was probably manufactured in Malta at around 1650.  This date is corroborated both by the style of the carving and by the evident aging of the wood. The present Għaxaq church was built at around that same time.  The statue is therefore key proof to the longevity of the devotion to Saint Joseph and has also significant historical and artistic value, being in absolute terms the oldest existing devotional statue in Għaxaq and one of the oldest still in existence on the entire Maltese Islands.

The Band Club is also in possession of two other separate properties: a fireworks factory that is renowned for the quality of its festive fiery production; and a feast decorations factory, comprising a workshop and stores for the Baroque-style festive street decorations.  The fireworks factory won the Villa de Bilbao international fireworks festival edition of 2010 against world-renowned international opponents.

The actual feast of Saint Joseph is celebrated throughout ten days.  While big crowds of people throng the streets of Għaxaq, the village puts on its best dress in green (the colour of the Saint Joseph clan) and is entirely decorated with the decorations manufactured or otherwise managed by the above-mentioned workshop.  The Club's own band and other guest bands play the typical Maltese band-marches to the general merry-making of the Josephite supporters, guests and tourists who are always welcome to join.  Street concerts are also held, many times attracting national attention.  Various fireworks displays are held throughout the week, culminating in the Saturday night show known as 'The Flames of Fire' and the Sunday evening 'kaxxa nfernali'.  The final celebration is the devotional procession of the statue of Saint Joseph through the village streets - a fitting conclusion for the Patron Saint.  This feast has increased its popularity over the years and has become a regular crowd-puller, putting Għaxaq in the top echelons of Maltese festivals.

"Ite ad Josef".

Carnival
Another annual event is the carnival celebration held in February.

The carnival celebration is reported to have been around for roughly 150 years, and also features a children's parade, an idea backed by the local council to encourage more children to take an interest in their local culture.

Interesting places in Għaxaq

Dar tal-Bebbux/Dar tal-Massi - sea-shells decorated house (St. Mary Street, behind the parish church)
St. Philip's Chapel (at St. Philip Square)
St. Lucy's Chapel (at the Outskirts of the village)
Christ the Redeemer Chapel (at the outskirts of the village)
Together with the Parish Church and the two masterpieces, the Band Clubs (as mentioned above)
Għaxaq Semaphore Tower

Zones in Għaxaq
Bir id-Deheb (Well of Gold)
Ħas-Saptan (Saptan Town)
Il-Miksur (The Broken)
Qasam Ħal-Dmikki
Tal-Barrani (Foreigner's Village)
Tal-Garda
Tal-Ġebel (Rocks' Village)
Tal-Millieri
Tal-Qattus (Cat's Village)
Tal-Wilġa (Open Field's Village)

Għaxaq main roads
Dawret Ħal Għaxaq (Għaxaq By-Pass)
Triq G.M. Farrugia (G.M. Farrugia Street)
Triq il-Belt Valletta (Valletta Road)
Triq il-Ġistakor (Tail-Coat Street)
Triq il-Garakol (Garakol Street)
Triq il-Gudja (Gudja Road)
Triq il-Milwa (Skein Street)
Triq iż-Żejtun (Zejtun Road)
Triq San Filippu (St. Philip Street)
Pjazza San Filippu (St. Philip Square)
Triq Santa Marija (St. Mary Street)
Vjal il-Labour (Labour Avenue)
Triq it-Tgezwira
Triq Ganmari Dalli
Pjazza Santu Rokku (St. Rocco Square)
Triq San Pawl (St. Paul Street)
Triq il-Knisja (church's street)
Triq Marjanu Gerada

Għaxaq Local Council
The current Għaxaq local council members are:
Darren Abela (Mayor - PL)
Christine Dalli (PL)
Rose Agius (PN)
Keith Fenech (PL)
Andreas Gatt (PL)

Sport 
 Ghaxaq F.C.

References

External links

Għaxaq Local Council
St. Mary's Band Club
St. Joseph's Band Club
The village of Għaxaq
Labour Party Għaxaq

 
Towns in Malta
Local councils of Malta